The 2012 East Carolina Pirates football team represented East Carolina University in the 2012 NCAA Division I FBS football season. They were led by third-year head coach Ruffin McNeill and played their home games at Dowdy–Ficklen Stadium. They were a member of the East Division of Conference USA.

Schedule

Source: Schedule

Game summaries

Appalachian State

@ South Carolina

@ Southern Miss

@ North Carolina

UTEP

@ UCF

Memphis

@ UAB

Navy

Houston

@ Tulane

Marshall

Louisiana–Lafayette–New Orleans Bowl

References

East Carolina
East Carolina Pirates football seasons
East Carolina Pirates football